Cloverdale station is a bus station and future intermodal station in Cloverdale, California. It is served by Amtrak Thruway and Sonoma County Transit buses. Additional service to Sonoma County Airport station is provided by Sonoma County Transit under contract by Sonoma–Marin Area Rail Transit.

History

A rail station previously served Cloverdale along the original Northwestern Pacific Railroad, and was listed on the National Register of Historic Places in 1976 as Cloverdale Railroad Station. That station, however, was destroyed in a fire in 1991. The rail line was rerouted to its current right of way to make room for U.S. Route 101 and the current station was built in 1998 with the anticipation of future rail service.

The depot must legally serve as the northern terminus of the Sonoma–Marin Area Rail Transit main line; it is expected open to passenger trains after further phases of construction. The 2018 California State Rail Plan called for the station to see SMART service by 2027.

References

External links

SMART - Stations

Bus stations in the San Francisco Bay Area
Transportation buildings and structures in Sonoma County, California
Sonoma-Marin Area Rail Transit stations in Sonoma County
Future Sonoma–Marin Area Rail Transit stations
1998 establishments in California
Railway stations scheduled to open in 2027
Amtrak Thruway Motorcoach stations in California
National Register of Historic Places in Sonoma County, California
Railway stations on the National Register of Historic Places in California